This article displays the rosters for the participating teams at the AfroBasket 2021. 

Age and club as of 24 August 2021.

Group A

Angola

Cape Verde

DR Congo

Rwanda

Group B

Central African Republic

Egypt

Guinea

Tunisia

Group C

Ivory Coast

Kenya

Mali

Nigeria

Group D

Cameroon

Senegal

South Sudan

Uganda

References

External links
Official website

2021
squads